Resolute or Resolute Bay is an Inuit hamlet on Cornwallis Island in Nunavut, Canada. It is situated at the northern end of Resolute Bay and the Northwest Passage and is part of the Qikiqtaaluk Region.

Resolute is one of Canada's northernmost communities and is second only to Grise Fiord on Ellesmere Island (Alert and Eureka are more northerly but are not considered towns; rather, military outposts and weather stations). As in most other northern communities, the roads and most of the terrain are all gravel. It is also the closest transit location to Devon Island, the largest uninhabited island in the world, and by extension, the most well-preserved crater on Earth - the Haughton impact crater, that formed about 31 million years ago.

Demographics 

Settlement

The area shows evidence of being occupied sporadically by the Dorset culture (Tuniit) and later the Thule people from as early as 1500 BCE until 1000 CE. However, modern Inuit did not occupy or use the area until the 1953 High Arctic relocation.

In 1947, Canada and the United States built a weather station, Resolute Weather Station, and an airstrip as part of the Joint Arctic Weather Stations: known today as the High Arctic Weather Stations. This was followed in 1949 by a Royal Canadian Air Force base, RCAF Station Resolute Bay. At that time, the population was made up of military personnel and specialists, such as meteorologists, from the south. Today, the base serves as one of the potential starting points for Arctic research and access to both the North Pole and the north magnetic pole.

Named after the Arctic exploration vessel , the community of Resolute got its start in 1953 as part of the High Arctic relocation. Efforts to assert Canadian sovereignty in the High Arctic during the Cold War, because of the area's strategic geopolitical position, led the Government of Canada to forcibly relocate Inuit from Nunavik (northern Quebec) to Resolute (and to Grise Fiord).

The first group of people, which included one Royal Canadian Mounted Police officer, Ross Gibson, who was also to become the community's first teacher, were relocated in 1953, along with a second group in 1955, from Inukjuak  (then known as Port Harrison), Quebec, and from Pond Inlet, Nunavut (then the Northwest Territories). They were promised homes and game to hunt, but the relocated people discovered no buildings and very little familiar wildlife. They also had to endure weeks of 24-hour darkness during the winter, and 24-hour sunlight during the summer: something that does not occur in northern Quebec.

They were told that they would be returned home after a year if they wished, but this offer was later withdrawn as it would have damaged Canada's claims to sovereignty in the area and the Inuit were forced to stay. Eventually, the Inuit learned the local beluga whale migration routes and were able to survive in the area, hunting over a range of  each year.

In 1993, the Canadian government held hearings to investigate the relocation program, and the following year the Royal Commission on Aboriginal Peoples issued a report entitled The High Arctic Relocation: A Report on the 1953–55 Relocation. The government paid $10 million CAD to the survivors and their families and gave a formal apology in 2008.

The community was originally built  from the base but, by the 1970s, the number of research people arriving in Resolute was causing problems. Between 1974 and 1975 the community was moved to a location allowing better municipal services, but poorly-sited for hunting purposes.

Contrary to popular stereotypes, people in this remote community have a low unemployment rate. Most citizens are employed at least part of the year; however, with 2010s changes to American policy toward polar bear hunting, the local economy is at risk as many Inuit cater to American sport hunters seeking polar bear trophies.

Facilities
The Tudjaat Co-op, part of the Arctic Co-operatives, runs a grocery/retail store and a hotel. There is also an airport gift shop called Polar Bear Hut.

The town has three hotels – Qausuittuq Inns North, South Camp Inn, and the Airport Hotel – which have fewer than 100 rooms each, and several lodges. Other facilities include a Royal Canadian Mounted Police Detachment, a school (which provides education from kindergarten to Grade 12) and a gym. There is also a remote campus of Nunavut Arctic College.

There is the Resolute Bay Health Centre/Nursing Station, staffed by nurses with a doctor visiting several times a year. Patients may be flown to the Qikiqtani General Hospital in Iqaluit or Ottawa.

Unlike a lot of Arctic communities there is only one church, the Resolute Bay Anglican Church.

Broadband communications 

The community has been served by the Qiniq network since 2005. The Qiniq network is designed and operated by SSi Canada. In 2017, the network was upgraded to 4G LTE technology, and 2G-GSM for mobile voice.

Military presence 

On August 8, 2007, CBC News reported that Canadian Armed Forces documents showed plans to build an army training centre in the community along with a $60 million deep water port at Nanisivik  to the southeast.

On August 10, 2007, then-Prime Minister, Stephen Harper, announced the construction of a pair of multimillion-dollar military facilities within the contested waters of Canada's Arctic territory. The facilities consist of a new army training centre at Resolute, and a deep-sea port at Nanisivik Naval Facility. A statement issued by the Prime Minister said, "The Training Centre will be a year-round multi-purpose facility supporting Arctic training and operations, accommodating up to 100 personnel. Training equipment and vehicles stationed at the site will also provide an increased capability and faster response time in support of regional military or civilian emergency operations."

On August 16, 2013, the Arctic Training Facility opened in Resolute.

On February 23, 2016, in response to an increase in Russian military presence in the Arctic, it was announced that the military training facility would be expanded. This would include, "more storage, more capacity to get more equipment in, prepositioning more equipment so we don't spend a fortune on airlift or chartered aircraft", said Lieutenant-colonel Luc St-Denis. Incinerators were also said to be proposed to minimize the environmental impact on the area.

Government of Canada facilities 
The government of Canada has several buildings around the community; namely, the Martin Bergmann Complex, named for Martin Bergmann, which houses the Polar Continental Shelf Program from Natural Resources Canada, enabling Arctic Science Research.

The Polar Continental Shelf Project (PCSP), a Government of Canada organization created in 1958. The centre may host up to 40 scientists as a starting location before they go to their field research. The PCSP provides researchers with efficient and safe logistics and, as part of the Arctic policy of Canada,  strengthens Canadian sovereignty in the area. It brings together scientists from diverse organizations, including many Geological Survey of Canada researchers, for interdisciplinary studies of the Canadian Arctic.

Climate
Resolute has a tundra climate or ET, a polar climate sub-type under the Köppen climate classification, with long cold winters and short cool summers. Resolute has a very dry climate with an average precipitation of  a year, most of it falling as snow from September to October.

Resolute has never experienced an above-freezing temperature between October 20 and May 6.

Between around April 30 and August 13, Resolute experiences midnight sun; whilst between around November 7 and February 4 there is polar night. Between late November and mid-January, the sun is so low that there is not even civil twilight, with the only exception from complete darkness being a deeper-blue sky called nautical twilight at noon, but there is no true experience of 24 hours of pitch black darkness around noon. For about two weeks before and after the midnight sun in Resolute, the nights are still quite bright since it does not get any darker than civil twilight (this is the twilight where surrounding objects are still visible and outdoor activities can go on without the need for artificial lighting). Resolute, however, does not experience night (the phase of day) from about March 14 to September 29.

Resolute does experience thunderstorms during the summer, but they are typically rare in the region.

Economy

Besides hunting guides and hotels Resolute has mixed and small sized employers:

 Resolute Bay School
 Hamlet of Resolute Council
 RCMP Resolute Detachment
 Resolute Bay Airport
 Tudjaat Co-op store

Transportation
Although not as busy as it once was, Resolute Bay Airport is still the core of the area, serving as an aviation hub for exploration in the region and connected by direct service to Iqaluit. On August 20, 2011, First Air Flight 6560 crashed into a hill while attempting to land at the airport. Of the fifteen people on board, twelve were killed and the remaining three were severely injured.

Within the community, most travel is by snowmobile and walking. Cars are limited. There are no taxis or public transit, but hotels offer shuttle service.

Notable people

Joseph Idlout, grandfather of singer Lucie Idlout and father of Leah Idlout, the community's second teacher, moved to Resolute in 1955 from Pond Inlet. Idlout, an Inuk hunter who was the subject of two National Film Board of Canada documentaries: Land of the Long Day, filmed in 1952 in Pond Inlet, and Between Two Worlds in 1990. He was for a time one of the most well-known Inuit and was shown on the back of the Canadian two-dollar bill. Celina Kalluk, notable performer of Inuit throat singing and children's author, was born here.

Racing

In 2007, the British television show Top Gear aired the Top Gear: Polar Special, which embarked from Resolute. The show was framed as a race to the north magnetic pole between hosts Jeremy Clarkson and James May driving a 2007 Toyota Hilux 3.0 litre diesel versus a team of sled dogs driven by American explorer Matty McNair with host Richard Hammond riding along. Clarkson and May successfully reached their destination, becoming the first in history to drive to the north magnetic pole; Hammond and McNair did not finish.

See also
List of municipalities in Nunavut

References

Further reading

 Bissett, Don. Resolute, An Area Economic Survey. Ottawa: Industrial Division, Dept. of Indian Affairs and Northern Development, 1968.
 Canadian Ice Service. Present and future sea ice travel: Resolute Maannaujuq ammalu sivuniksattinni sikukkut aullaaqattarniq: Qausuittuq = Déplacements actuels et futurs sur la glace de mer: Resolute. Ottawa: Canadian Ice Service = Service Canadien des glaces, 2007. 
 Lahoutifard, Nazafarin, Melissa Sparling, and David Lean. 2005. "Total and Methyl Mercury Patterns in Arctic Snow During Springtime at Resolute, Nunavut, Canada". Atmospheric Environment. 39, no. 39: 7597.

External links

 Resolute Bay 1961, British Pathe Newsreel – New Arctic Station

Populated places established in 1947
Populated places in Arctic Canada
Hamlets in the Qikiqtaaluk Region
1947 establishments in the Northwest Territories
Road-inaccessible communities of Nunavut